Baroness von Sketch Show is a Canadian television sketch comedy series. It debuted on CBC Television on June 14, 2016. Produced by Frantic Films, the series is an all-female comedy series starring Carolyn Taylor, Meredith MacNeill, Aurora Browne and Jennifer Whalen. The four also serve as executive producers of the show.

CBC renewed the show for a second season, which aired in 2017. The show's third season started in September 2018, and CBC renewed the show for a fourth season, that began airing shows in October 2019. CBC has announced that the show would continue with a 5th and final season starting October 6, 2020.

The show also airs on IFC in the United States. The show is a three-time winner of the Canadian Screen Award for Best Sketch Comedy Program or Series, winning at the 5th Canadian Screen Awards in 2017, the 6th Canadian Screen Awards in 2018, and the 7th Canadian Screen Awards in 2019.

Cast 

 Jennifer Whalen as various
 Aurora Browne as various
 Carolyn Taylor as various
 Meredith MacNeill as various

Episodes

Season 1 (2016)

Season 2 (2017)

Season 3 (2018)

Season 4 (2019)

Season 5 (2020-2021)

References

External links

 at CBC.ca

2010s Canadian sketch comedy television series
2010s Canadian LGBT-related comedy television series
2016 Canadian television series debuts
2020s Canadian LGBT-related comedy television series
2020s Canadian sketch comedy television series
CBC Television original programming
Canadian Comedy Award winners